Lucien Laplace (born 1906, date of death unknown) was a French boxer. He competed in the men's welterweight event at the 1932 Summer Olympics.

References

1906 births
Year of death missing
French male boxers
Olympic boxers of France
Boxers at the 1932 Summer Olympics
Welterweight boxers